Corruption in South Korea is moderate compared to most countries in the Asia-Pacific and the broader international community. Transparency International's 2022 Corruption Perceptions Index scored South Korea at 63 on a scale between 0 ("highly corrupt") and 100 ("very clean"). When ranked by score, South Korea ranked 31st among the 180 countries in the Index, where the country ranked first is perceived to have the most honest public sector.  For comparison, the best score was 90 (ranked 1), and the worst score was 12 (ranked 180).

Notable cases
President Park Geun-hye was found guilty in 16 charges, including abuse of power and bribery, then she was imprisoned for 25 years. Another former president Lee Myung-bak was also charged with corruption scandals involving major companies in 2018 and he was sentenced 17 years in jail.

As a result of such scandals, coupled with other incidents, such as the Sewol disaster, a 2015 report released by the Organization for Economic Cooperation and Development (OECD) showed that "[a]almost 70 percent of South Koreans distrust their government, while less than 30 percent of them are confident in the nation's judicial system." This rate is significantly lower than the OECD  average, which was 41.8 percent. Despite South Korea's low public confidence rate in 2015, it was at least a step up from the rate in 2007 by 10 percentage points.

The government has taken steps to fight corruption, such as the Act on the Protection of Public Interest Whistle-Blowers which protect whistleblowers who report public and private corruption as well as foreign bribery. Public services have also been digitalised in order to avoid opportunities for corruption. However, large chaebols pose significant difficulties as illicit business behaviour is still common among them. Some of the large conglomerates have been involved in tax evasion and corruption, and their powerful role in South Korea's economy has made corruption investigation very difficult.

Notable incidents
2008 Grand National Party Convention bribery incident
Anti-corruption agency
BBK stock price manipulation incident
Daewoo dissolution and corruption scandal
Improper Solicitation and Graft Act
MOFAT Diamond scandal
2016 South Korean political scandal
South Korean illegal surveillance incident
South Korean nuclear scandal
Gwangju Inhwa School
Jeon-gwan ye-u

See also

Government of South Korea

References

External links
 The Republic of Korea Corruption Profile from the Business Anti-Corruption Portal

 
South Korea
South Korea